This is a list of released games for the Sega Pico video game console. The list is sorted by games alphabetically along with their developer and publisher. It does not include games released for the system's successor, Advanced Pico Beena.

As of January 2015, the total number of games released for the console is unknown, however, over 300 games were released for it.

Games

There are  games on this list.

Advanced Pico Beena games

There are  games on this list.

Notes

References

External links
Sega Pico - Storyware (ARCHIVE)

 
Sega Pico games
Saga Pico
Children's educational video games